CXP may refer to:

Airports
Carson Airport (FAA: CXP), an airport in Carson City, Nevada
Tunggul Wulung Airport (IATA: CXP), in Central Java
Xtra Airways (ICAO: CXP), an American ultra low-cost carrier

Other uses
CXP (connector), an electrical connector used for Infiniband and Ethernet
CoaXPress, a high speed serial data interface over coaxial cable
Constellation Program (abbreviated CxP), NASA's cancelled crewed space flight program
Corporate Express, an office products company
CXP Rims, a brand of bicycle rims made by Mavic
The conventional CXP Series of Mack Trucks products